Surprise Lake is located next to The Dock at Surprise Lake apartment complex at Milton, Washington, United States.

Lakes of Washington (state)
Lakes of Pierce County, Washington